Gundulf and its variants (Gondulf, Gundulph, Kundolf, Gondulphus, Gundulfus, Gundolfo, Gondon) is a Germanic given name, from gund, "battle", and wulf, "wolf".

It may refer to:
Gondulf of Provence, 6th-century duke and possibly made Bishop of Metz in 591
Indulf (6th century), also known as Gundulf, Byzantine mercenary and Ostrogoth army leader
Gondulphus of Berry, 7th-century bishop
Gondulph of Maastricht (died after 614), bishop and Roman Catholic and Eastern Orthodox saint
Gondulphus of Metz (died 823), Bishop of Metz
Gundolfo, early 11th century Italian heretic
Gundulf of Rochester (died 1108), English bishop

See also
Gandulf
Castel Gandolfo

Germanic masculine given names